Secondary Highway 610, commonly referred to as Highway 610, was a provincially maintained secondary highway in the Canadian province of Ontario that connected Highway 101 at Hoyle, east of Timmins, with former Highway 67 (now Municipal Road) near Barbers Bay, passing through the village of Connaught en route. Highway 610 was assumed by the Department of Highways, predecessor to the modern Ministry of Transportation of Ontario, in 1956, along with many of the secondary highways in Ontario. It remained unchanged between then and 1997, when it was decommissioned and transferred to the CIty of Timmins. The entire route is now known as Frederick House Lake Road.

Route description 
Highway 610 began at Highway 101 in Hoyle, on the eastern side of Timmins, by travelling north and immediately curving northeast to cross the North Porcupine River. It travelled straight through thick forests, parallel to and northwest of an Ontario Northland Railway line for  before the road forked at Dugwal. Highway 610 took the eastward fork and crossed the railway line. The last several kilometres of the route travelled parallel to and north of the railway line along the southern shoreline of Frederick House Lake before eventually crossing the railway and ending at Highway 67 near Barbers Bay, passing through the village of  en route.

History 
Highway 610 was first assumed by the Department of Highways in 1956, along with several dozen other secondary highways. It was likely maintained as a development road prior to that.
It remained unchanged between then and the late 1990s. Budget constraints brought on by a recession in the early 1990s resulted in the Mike Harris provincial government forming the Who Does What? committee to determine cost-cutting measures in order to balance the budget after a deficit incurred by former premier Bob Rae.
It was determined that many Ontario highways no longer served long-distance traffic movement and should therefore be maintained by local or regional levels of government. The MTO consequently transferred many highways to lower levels of government in 1997 and 1998, removing a significant percentage of the provincial highway network.
On April 1, 1997, the entire route was decommissioned as a provincial highway and transferred to the City of Timmins.
Highway 610 is now known as Frederick House Lake Road throughout its length.

Major intersections

References 

610
610